RuPaul's DragCon UK is an fan convention and expo of drag culture held in London, UK. The convention debuted on January 18, 2020. It's based on the successful RuPaul's DragCon LA and NYC, which are related to the popular television show: RuPaul's Drag Race.

DragCon markets itself to all people of all ages, its emerging target market is young children, who must attend accompanied by parents. Its secondary revenue is through door tickets and its primary revenue is through photo opportunities taken from customers on the day.

History

2020 
After the events of RuPaul's DragCon LA and NYC, they announced another convention which took place at London. RuPaul, Michelle Visage, and the whole cast of RuPaul's Drag Race UK (series 1) will join the convention. The event took place on January 18–19.

Unfortunately, on the day of the event, people were waiting outside the venue for over two hours. Without any explanation, the security staff told the ticket holder to come back the next day. Many people were demanding a "Ru-fund" (refund), the hashtag was trending on Twitter and compared the event to Fyre Festival and TanaCon. The official Twitter account of RuPaul's DragCon explained that the Health and Safety officials advised them to stop the queue due to "health and safety fears".

The convention had many panels, such as Sibling Rivalry Podcast, the Netflix series: AJ and the Queen, and RuPaul's Drag Race Las Vegas. The venue also had the signature Kid Zone, with Drag Queen Story Hour and a kids' fashion show.

2023 
In March 2022, RuPaul's DragCon UK announced that the convention is coming back after its indefinite hiatus, due to the COVID-19 pandemic. The convention is set to last for three days (January 6–8, 2023), at the Exhibition Centre London with over 80 drag queens attending the events. RuPaul's Drag Race: UK vs the World contestants are also joining the convention, such as Baga Chipz, Pangina Heals, Lemon, and Mo Heart.

References 

2020 establishments in the United Kingdom
Drag Race (franchise)
LGBT events in the United Kingdom
Drag events
2020 in LGBT history